Kael may refer to:

 Chris Kael, member of the American rock band Five Finger Death Punch
 Pauline Kael, American author and movie critic
 Derek Paxton, known as "Kael", video game designer and project leader for the Fall from Heaven series of game mods based on the game Civilization 4.

See also
 Kail (surname)
 Kale (disambiguation)